The 2016 Football League Trophy Final was a football match played at Wembley Stadium on 3 April 2016 to decide the winners of the 2015–16 Football League Trophy, the 32nd edition of the Football League Trophy, a knock-out tournament for the 48 teams in League One and League Two.

It was played between Barnsley of League One and Oxford United of League Two, neither of whom had played in a League Trophy final before. Barnsley won 3–2. United led 1–0 at half-time through a goal from Callum O'Dowda. An own-goal by Chey Dunkley early in the second half was followed by goals from Ashley Fletcher and Adam Hammill to give Barnsley a two-goal cushion. A header from Danny Hylton in the 76th minute reduced the deficit, but United were unable to find an equaliser in the remaining minutes and suffered defeat at Wembley for the first time in their history.

Match details

Post-match
Both Barnsley and Oxford United were promoted from their respective leagues at the end of the 2015–16 season. Winners Barnsley were promoted  to the Championship, after beating Millwall 3–1 in the League One play-off final at Wembley Stadium on 29 May 2016. Runners-up Oxford United were promoted to League One, after finishing second in League Two, on 7 May 2016.

References

2016
Events at Wembley Stadium
Barnsley F.C. matches
Oxford United F.C. matches
2016 sports events in London
2015–16 Football League
April 2016 sports events in the United Kingdom